Kathleen Agnes Cavendish, Marchioness of Hartington ( Kennedy; February 20, 1920 – May 13, 1948), also known as "Kick" Kennedy, was an American socialite. She was the second daughter of Joseph P. Kennedy Sr. and Rose Kennedy as well as a sister of U.S. President John F. Kennedy and Senators Robert F. Kennedy and Edward M. "Ted" Kennedy and the wife of the Marquess of Hartington, heir apparent to the 10th Duke of Devonshire.

When her father was serving as United States Ambassador to the United Kingdom, Kathleen made many friends in London and was the "debutante of 1938". Working with the Red Cross, she began a romantic relationship with Lord Hartington, whom she married in May 1944. He was killed on active service in Belgium only four months later. Kathleen died in a plane crash in 1948, flying to the south of France while on vacation with her new partner, the 8th Earl Fitzwilliam.

Early years
Kathleen Agnes Kennedy was born at home at 83 Beals Street in Brookline, Massachusetts on February 20, 1920, the fourth child and second daughter of Joseph P. Kennedy Sr. and Rose Fitzgerald. She was nicknamed "Kick" because of her "irrepressible nature". Kathleen was especially close to her older brother, John F. Kennedy, known as "Jack". Her other siblings were Joseph Jr., Rosemary, Eunice, Patricia, Robert, Jean and Ted. 

Kathleen was educated at Riverdale Country School in the Riverdale section of the Bronx, New York City. She also attended Noroton Convent of the Sacred Heart in Noroton, Connecticut, and the Holy Child Convent in Neuilly, France. While the Kennedy daughters were not raised to have political ambitions like their brothers, they were nonetheless provided with many of the same educational and social opportunities, owing to their father's powerful financial and political connections and influence. This was particularly the case when President Franklin D. Roosevelt appointed Joseph as United States Ambassador to the United Kingdom in 1938.

As a child, Kathleen was very athletic and played football with her brothers. Her optimism and high spirits attracted many suitors, some of whom were Jack's closest friends. When Kathleen attended the Riverdale Country School, her mother did not approve of the male attention she attracted, and sent her to the all-girls Noroton Convent of the Sacred Heart. Eventually, Kathleen started to date, and had her first serious relationship with, Peter Grace, an heir to W. R. Grace and Company.

Britain 

Kathleen's time in Britain during her father's term as Ambassador dramatically influenced the remainder of her life. While living in England, she was educated in London at Queen's College and quickly cultivated a wide circle of friends, both male and female, in British high society. She dated David Rockefeller and was declared the "debutante of 1938" by the English media when she made her debut at the Queen Charlotte's Ball.

Following the German invasion of Poland and the outbreak of World War II in September 1939, Kick, who was staying at the family home in the south of France, had to rush to England with her friend Janey Kenyon Slaney. The Kennedy family, to save Joseph and daughter Rosemary, returned to the United States. Kathleen, having become very fond of England and the many friends she had made during her two years there, petitioned her parents to remain in London in spite of the coming danger. However, she was overruled by her father, and sailed back home in the early fall of 1939.

After returning to the U.S., Kennedy enrolled at the Finch School for a time, and then attended Florida Commercial College. In addition to her studies, she also began volunteering work for the American Red Cross. In 1941, she decided to leave school, and began working as a research assistant for Frank Waldrop, the executive editor for the Washington Times-Herald. She later teamed with Inga Arvad, who wrote the "Did You Happen to See....." column, and was eventually given her own column where she reviewed films and plays.

Marriage 

In 1943, seeking a way to return to England, Kathleen signed up to work in a center for servicemen set up by the Red Cross. During her time in England, both before and particularly during the war, she grew increasingly more independent from her family and the Roman Catholic Church to which they belonged. During this time, Kennedy began a romantic relationship with politician William Cavendish, Marquess of Hartington (usually known to his family and friends as Billy Hartington). He was the eldest son and heir apparent of the 10th Duke of Devonshire.

The two had met and begun a friendship when she moved to England when her father was appointed American Ambassador. Despite objections from her mother, Kennedy and Lord Hartington reunited upon her return to England. Rose especially rejected their relationship because she saw that their marriage would break the laws of the Roman Catholic Church by allowing Kathleen's children to be raised in the Church of England (Anglican Communion) rather than the Roman Catholic Church.  Rose even tried to manipulate their relationship by keeping Kathleen away from Hartington and postponing a possible wedding. Regardless, Kathleen married Hartington on May 6, 1944, in a civil ceremony at the Caxton Hall Register Office. Kathleen's eldest brother Joseph P. Kennedy Jr., an officer in the United States Navy, to whom she had grown close during the last year of his life, as he was serving in Britain, was the only member of the family to attend the ceremony. Her second eldest brother, John, was still hospitalized due to a back injury incurred on the motor torpedo patrol boat PT-109 in the South Pacific Ocean, while her younger brother, Robert F. Kennedy, was in naval training. On August 12, 1944, Joe Jr. was killed when his plane exploded over the English Channel during a top-secret bombing mission in Europe.

Widowhood
Kathleen, now Marchioness of Hartington, and Lord Hartington spent less than five weeks together before he went out to fight in France. Four months after their marriage, and less than a month after Joe Jr. was killed, Hartington was killed by a sniper during a battle with the Germans in Belgium. With his family's blessing, he was buried close to where he fell. His younger brother Lord Andrew Cavendish, who was married to Deborah Mitford, one of the Mitford sisters, thus became the heir apparent to the dukedom, as Billy Hartington had left no heir.

Popular on the London social circuit and admired by many for her high spirits and wit, Lady Hartington eventually became romantically involved with the 8th Earl Fitzwilliam, who was in the process of divorcing his wife. Once again, Rose Kennedy expressed her disapproval of her daughter's suitor and warned Kathleen that she would be disowned and cut off financially if she married Lord Fitzwilliam. In May 1948, Kathleen learned that her father would be traveling to Paris. In an effort to gain his consent for her upcoming plans to marry Fitzwilliam, she decided to fly to Paris to meet with her father.

Death

On May 13, 1948, Lady Hartington and Lord Fitzwilliam were flying from Paris to the French Riviera for a vacation aboard a de Havilland DH.104 Dove. At 3:30 in the afternoon, their plane took off, reaching an altitude of 10,000 feet (3,000 m). Approximately one hour into the flight, radio contact was lost with the plane when it entered the region near Vienne which was also close to the center of a storm. The plane's four occupants endured twenty minutes of severe turbulence which bounced their small plane up and down as much as several thousand feet at a time.

When they finally cleared the clouds, they instantly discovered the plane was in a dive and moments away from impact, and they attempted to pull up. The stress of the turbulence, coupled with the sudden change of direction, tore loose one of the wings, followed by both engines, and finally the tail. The plane's fuselage then spun into the ground seconds later, coming to rest nose-down in a ravine, after striking terrain at Plateau du Coiron, near Saint-Bauzile, Ardèche, France. Lady Hartington was instantly killed, along with Fitzwilliam, the pilot Peter Townshend and the navigator Arthur Freeman.

She is buried on the Cavendish family burial grounds, in the Church at Edensor outside of Chatsworth, England. Her father was the only family member to attend the funeral, arranged by the Devonshires. Rose Kennedy had refused to attend her daughter's funeral, instead entering a hospital for medical reasons.

Popular culture
The Kennedy Debutante, a novelization of Kennedy's life, was published by Berkley Books in 2018. Written by Kerri Maher, it was well received, including being named a "Best Book of the Week" by the New York Post.

Kathleen Kennedy is portrayed by Darleen Carr in the 1977 TV movie Young Joe, the Forgotten Kennedy, by Tracy Pollan in the 1990 TV miniseries The Kennedys of Massachusetts, and by Robin Tunney in the 1993 TV miniseries JFK: Reckless Youth.

Legacy
 The gymnasium at Manhattanville College is named in Kathleen Kennedy's honor.
 Robert F. Kennedy named his eldest daughter in honor of his sister.

See also
 Chatsworth House
 Duke of Devonshire
 Kennedy family tree
 Kennedy curse

References

Further reading
 
 
 Leamer, Laurence. The Kennedy Women: The Saga of an American Family. New York: Villard Books, 1994. Print.

External links
 
 Secrets of The Manor House, first shown of Channel 4, later on Yesterday, Series 1, Episode 3.

1920 births
1948 deaths
American debutantes
American emigrants to the United Kingdom
American socialites
American people of Irish descent
British courtesy marchionesses
Burials in Derbyshire
Kathleen
Finch College alumni
Kennedy family
People educated at Queen's College, London
People from Brookline, Massachusetts
Victims of aviation accidents or incidents in France
Victims of aviation accidents or incidents in 1948
Catholics from Massachusetts
Riverdale Country School alumni